Milev Rocks (‘Milevi Skali’ \'mi-le-vi ska-'li\) is the group of rocks off the north coast of Robert Island in the South Shetland Islands, Antarctica, situated east of Henfield Rock, south-southwest of Orsoya Rocks and southwest of Mellona Rocks, and extending  in east-west direction and  in north-south direction.

The rocks are named after the Bulgarian poet Geo Milev (pseudonym of Georgi Milyov Kasabov, 1895–1925).

Location

British mapping in 1968 and Bulgarian in 2009.

See also 
 Composite Antarctic Gazetteer
 List of Antarctic and sub-Antarctic islands
 List of Antarctic islands south of 60° S
 SCAR
 Territorial claims in Antarctica

Maps
 L.L. Ivanov. Antarctica: Livingston Island and Greenwich, Robert, Snow and Smith Islands. Scale 1:120000 topographic map.  Troyan: Manfred Wörner Foundation, 2009.

References
 Milev Rocks. SCAR Composite Antarctic Gazetteer.
 Bulgarian Antarctic Gazetteer. Antarctic Place-names Commission. (details in Bulgarian, basic data in English)

External links
 Milev Rocks. Copernix satellite image

Rock formations of Robert Island
Bulgaria and the Antarctic